Pigion can refer to:

 Columbidae, a zoological family
 pidgin, a linguistic concept